St. Charles Hotel may signify:
St. Charles Hotel (Los Angeles), originally called the Bella Union Hotel
St. Charles Hotel (Pierre, South Dakota)
St. Charles Hotel, New Orleans
Rector Hotel (Seattle, Washington), known as the St. Charles Hotel from 1917 to 1931.